On 17 February 1992, the Ethiopian Radio announced the discovery of burial of the Ethiopian Emperor Haile Selassie beneath his office in National Palace by workmen. The discovery happened nearly one year after the former military government Derg collapse in 1991, and under the interim government led by the Ethiopian People's Revolutionary Democratic Front (EPRDF). 

Countless speculations spurred around the circumstances of his death in 1975, and mostly reflected on the alleged plot of the Derg assassination under Mengistu Haile Mariam.  His remains kept in Ba'ata Mariam Church near the tomb of Menelik II, lying in the glass-fronted case in the perfumed crypt until burial ceremony took place on 23 July, the 100th anniversary of the Emperor birth. He was reburied at Holy Trinity Cathedral in Addis Ababa on 5 November 2000.

Background
The Ethiopian Revolution ended with a coup d'état of Emperor Haile Selassie in September 1974 by coordinated military junta known as the Derg headed by chairman Aman Andom. On 27 August 1975, Haile Selassie reportedly died after staying home arrest at National Palace from unknown circumstances. There was also speculation that Haile Selassie had complications during medical procedure. Another speculation that Haile Selassie was killed by Marxist army officers by strangulation at his bed. Similar allegations speculated that he was suffocated with a pillow by an assassin employed by the Derg government under Mengistu Haile Mariam leadership.

The Derg radio newscast said that he has been found dead at his bed by a servant, and reflected his cause of death to prostate operation, which he had underwent two months ago. Official sources said that the burial of the Emperor would be "in strictest privacy". In the court trial, 67 former members of the Derg said that the Emperor's opponents had met on 23 August 1975 "and with complete premeditation resolved that His Imperial Majesty Haile Selassie should be strangled because he was head of the feudal system." The charge added that he was strangulated on 26 August in his bed.

Event
On 17 February 1992, the Ethiopian Radio announced the discovery of the remains of Ethiopian Emperor Haile Selassie were exhumed from beneath his office in National Palace by workmen. This happened almost a year after the collapse of the Derg regime and the power of the Ethiopian People's Revolutionary Democratic Front (EPRDF). His remains were kept in Ba'ata Mariam Church near the tomb of Menelik II, lying in a box on a shelf in a glass-fronted case in the perfumed crypt until the burial ceremony took place on 23 July, the 100th anniversary of his birth. Mengistu Haile Mariam was widely suspected in the involvement of the covert burial. Forensic examination was expected to perform the cause of death of the Emperor despite the burial ceremony set up spontaneously.

His monarchist supporters as well as family members alleged that he was killed by Mengistu and his six army officers, a claim reiterated by several exiled prominent people during the reign of the Derg. The government of Ethiopia under transitional government did not find corroborate evidence for murder charge at the time. A forensic examination took his skull jaw bone and teeth to test whether the Emperor murdered. According to officials close to Mengistu, they had saw the Emperor in healthy condition and had not shown murdered sign in the night before his death. Likewise, Eshetu Tekle Mariam reiterated similar assertion that the Emperor was in good condition before a valet found him dead. The valet told he found the body lying face off his bed, after smelled malodor that comes from his bed. Haile Selassie reburied at Holy Trinity Cathedral in Addis Ababa on 5 November 2000 carried by a small coffin.

References

1992 in Ethiopia
Haile Selassie